The 2008 M-1 Challenge season was the first season of mixed martial arts (MMA) fighting presented by the M-1 Global promotion.

Main Rules
 5 fighters in team
 9 countries
 20 rounds and final

Final Team Standings

 January 11, 2009 M-1 Challenge Finals

at Holland

 Russian Red Devil defeated  Holland 4-1 to claim the first M-1 Challenge.

Events

References

External links
 M-1 Global Official Site

2008 in mixed martial arts
2008